The Diplomatic Academy of London (DAL), possibly also known as the London Academy of Diplomacy, is an institution that is not "recognised or "listed" (is unaccredited) in the United Kingdom. It says that it offers MA, MPhil and PhD Degrees and training programmes in Diplomatic Studies and International Relations on-line. It is little known among experts in the field, but attained a certain notoriety in the USA due a claimed association by Joseph Mifsud, who reportedly had sought to connect Donald Trump's 2016 presidential campaign with Russian governmental officials. Mr Mifsud says that he established the Academy.

Variations of the name
Various permutations of the name and personalities (which may be coincidental) have been associated with a number of UK Universities:
 University of East Anglia (20112015).
 University of Stirling (20162018).
 University of Westminster (2019?).
 Glasgow Caledonian University.(current ).

Similar but unconnected names
The UK's Foreign and Commonwealth Office has a Diplomatic Academy (in London) but the similarity of name is coincidental.

References 

Schools of international relations